Monclova Township is one of the eleven townships of Lucas County, Ohio, United States.  The 2010 census found 12,400 people in the township. According to the 2020 U.S. Census, the population grew to 14,550.

Geography
Located in the central part of the county, it borders the following townships and city:
Springfield Township - north
Maumee - east
Perrysburg Township, Wood County - southeast
Waterville Township - south
Swanton Township - west
Spencer Township - northwest
Whitehouse - southwest

No municipalities are located in Monclova Township, although the unincorporated community of Monclova lies in the township's center.

Name and history
Monclova Township was organized in 1853. It is the only Monclova Township statewide. According to Monclova Township's Land Use Plan 2009, the name "Monclova" means "one clan."

Government
The township is governed by a three-member board of trustees, who are elected in November of odd-numbered years to a four-year term beginning on the following January 1. Two are elected in the year after the presidential election and one is elected in the year before it. There is also an elected township fiscal officer, who serves a four-year term beginning on April 1 of the year after the election, which is held in November of the year before the presidential election. Vacancies in the fiscal officership or on the board of trustees are filled by the remaining trustees.

References

External links
Township website
County website

Townships in Lucas County, Ohio
Townships in Ohio
Populated places established in 1853